Georgi Pulevski, sometimes also Gjorgji,  Gjorgjija Pulevski or Đorđe Puljevski ( or Ѓорѓија Пулевски, ; 1817–1895) was a Mijak writer and revolutionary, known today as the first author to express publicly the idea of a Macedonian nation distinct from Bulgarian, as well as a separate Macedonian language. 
Pulevski was born in 1817 in Galičnik, then under the rule of the Ottoman Empire, and died in 1895 in Sofia, Principality of Bulgaria. Trained as a stonemason, he became a self-taught writer in matters relating to the Macedonian language and culture. In Bulgaria he is regarded as a Bulgarian and early adherent to Macedonism.

Early life
Pulevski was born in the Mijak tribal region. As a seven-year-old, he went with his father to Danubian Principalities on seasonal work (pečalba). According to popular legends in his youth, Pulevski was  engaged in a hajduk in the area of Golo Brdo.

Military activity

In 1862, Pulevski fought as a member of the Bulgarian Legion against the Ottoman siege at Belgrade. He also participated in the Serbian–Ottoman War in 1876, and then in the Russo-Turkish War of 1877–78, which led to the Liberation of Bulgaria; during the latter he was a voivode of a unit of Bulgarian volunteers, taking part in the Battle of Shipka Pass. After the war, he went to live in the newly liberated Bulgarian capital Sofia. He also participated as a volunteer in the Kresna-Razlog Uprising (1878–79), which aimed at unification of Ottoman Macedonia with Bulgaria. In an application for a veteran pension to the Bulgarian Parliament in 1882, he expressed his regret about the failure of this unification. From 1883 Pulevski finally received a government pension in recognition of his service as a Bulgarian volunteer, until his death in 1895.

Works

In 1875, he published in Belgrade a book called Dictionary of Three Languages (Rečnik od tri jezika, Речник од три језика). It was a conversational phrasebook composed in "question-and-answer" style in three parallel columns, in Macedonian, Albanian and Turkish, all three spelled in Cyrillic. Pulevski chose to write in the local Macedonian rather than the Bulgarian standard based on eastern Tarnovo dialects. His language was an attempt at creating a supra-dialectal Macedonian norm, but with a bias towards his own native local Galičnik dialect The text of the Rečnik contains programmatic statements where Pulevski argues for an independent Slavic Macedonian nation and language.

His next published works were a revolutionary poem, Samovila Makedonska ('A Macedonian Fairy') published in 1878, and a Macedonian Song Book in two volumes, published in 1879 in Belgrade, which contained both folk songs collected by Pulevski and some original poems by himself.

In 1880, Pulevski published Slavjano-naseljenski makedonska slognica rečovska ('Grammar of the language of the Slavic Macedonian population'), a work that is today known as the first attempt at a grammar of Macedonian. In it, Pulevski systematically contrasted his language, which he called našinski ("our language") or slavjano-makedonski ("Slavic-Macedonian") with both Serbian and Bulgarian. All records of this book were lost during the first half of 20th century and only discovered again in the 1950s in Sofia. Owing to the writer's lack of formal training as a grammarian and dialectologist, it is today considered of limited descriptive value; however, it has been characterised as "seminal in its signaling of ethnic and linguistic consciousness but not sufficiently elaborated to serve as a codification", In 1892, Pulevski completed the first Slavjanomakedonska opšta istorija (General History of the Macedonian Slavs), a large  manuscript with over 1700 pages. In his last work: “Jazitshnica, soderzsayushtaja starobolgarski ezik, uredena em izpravlena da se uchat bolgarski i makedonski sinove i kerki"; ('Grammar, containing Old Bulgarian language, arranged and corrected to be taught to Bulgarian and Macedonian sons and daughters'), he considered the Macedonian dialects to be old Bulgarian and the differences between the two purely geographical.

Ancestry and identification

According to one view, his surname is of Vlach origin, as is the case with several other surnames in Mijak territory, pointed out with the Vlach suffix -ul (present in Pulevci, Gugulevci, Tulevci, Gulovci, Čudulovci, etc.), however, those families espoused a Mijak identity, and had no ties to the Aromanian (cincar) community.
According to one source, Pulevski's ancestors settled Galičnik from Pulaj, a small maritime village, near Velipojë, at the end of the 15th century, hence the surname Pulevski. 

The definition of the ethnic Macedonian identity arose from the writings of Georgi Pulevski, who identified the existence of a distinct modern Macedonian language and nation. Pulevski summarized the folk histories of the Macedonian people and concluded that the Macedonians were descendants of the ancient Macedonians. This opinion was based on the claim that the ancient Macedonian language had Slavic components in it, and thus, the ancient Macedonians were Slavic, and that modern Macedonians were descendants of them. However, his Macedonian self-identification was ambiguous. Pulevski viewed Macedonian identity as being a regional phenomenon, similar to Herzegovinians and Thracians. Pulevski himself identified as a mijak galički (a "Mijak from Galičnik", 1875), sometimes described himself as a "Serbian patriot" and also viewed his ethnic designation as "Bulgarian from the village of Galičnik".

List of works
 Blaze Ristovski (ed. ) (1974) Georgija M. Pulevski: Odbrani stranici ('Collected Works'), Skopje: Makedonska kniga.
 Dictionary of three languages - wikisource translation. 
 Gjorgji Pulevski – Rechnik od tri jazika (Речник од три јазика) , PDF
 "A dictionary of three languages" on Commons.
 "A dictionary of four languages" on Commons.

References

Sources

External links

1817 births
1893 deaths
People from Galičnik
Bulgarian writers
Serbian writers
19th-century Bulgarian people
Macedonian writers
Macedonian culture
Macedonian Bulgarians
Macedonia under the Ottoman Empire
Bulgarian people of the Russo-Turkish War (1877–1878)
Early Macedonists
Serbian–Turkish Wars (1876–1878)